Geminicoccus is a Gram-negative, and´strictly aerobic genus of bacteria from the family of Geminicoccaceae with one known species (Geminicoccus roseus). Geminicoccus roseus has been isolated from a biofilter from Rehovot in Israel.

References

Rhodospirillales
Bacteria genera
Monotypic bacteria genera
Taxa described in 2008